Triangle Country Club is a cricket ground in Triangle, Masvingo, Zimbabwe attached to a larger sporting complex. The first major recorded match was a first-class fixture between Zimbabwe-Rhodesia B and Border in the 1979/80 Castle Bowl, which ended in a draw. For the next thirty-four years the ground held no further major matches, until 2013 when the Southern Rocks were due to play the Mountaineers in a List A match in the 2012/13 Zimbabwe Domestic One-Day Competition, however this match was abandoned. In that same season the Southern Rocks were also due to play a single Twenty20 match there in the Domestic Twenty20 Competition, however this match too was abandoned.

See also
List of cricket grounds in Zimbabwe

References

External links
Triangle Country Club, Triangle at ESPNcricinfo
Triangle Country Club, Triangle at CricketArchive

Cricket grounds in Zimbabwe
Buildings and structures in Masvingo Province